Tân Bình is a rural commune (xã) of Mỏ Cày Bắc District, Bến Tre Province, Mekong Delta region of Vietnam. The commune covers 9.94 km2, with a population of 8493 (2009), and a population density of 854 inhabitants/km2.

References 

Communes of Bến Tre province
Populated places in Bến Tre province